Olshammar is a locality situated in Askersund Municipality, Örebro County, Sweden with 271 inhabitants in 2010.

References 

Populated places in Örebro County
Populated places in Askersund Municipality